Dream Master is the debut studio album by American singer-songwriter Billie Hughes, released in 1979 on Epic Records by CBS Canada. Hughes composed all of the songs with "Stealin' My Heart Away" issued as the first single in 1979. The album was produced by Henry Lewy who held recording sessions at A&M Studios featuring top Los Angeles session musicians including Jeff Porcaro, Russ Kunkel, Victor Feldman, Wilton Felder, Mike Melvoin, and Mike Porcaro, Oscar Castro-Neves and a guest appearance by José Feliciano on guitar and background vocals.

The album was released in the US and internationally where in Japan, it received attention in the Osaka region, and Europe, in connection with the release of Hughes' Martin Eden single, appearing as the theme song of the Martin Eden mini-series, an Italian production broadcasting pan-Europe. In Germany, the album was released with Martin Eden opening the album, as a bonus track.

The album was released on vinyl by Epic Records in 1979. It was re-released in Japan in 1982 when Billie Hughes moved to Japan for four months to perform in Osaka. Dream Master was re-released in Japan in CD format during the 1990s, after the success of Hughes' second solo album, Welcome to the Edge, and again in 2001.

Background 
After recording two albums with his band Lazarus in Woodstock and New York City, Hughes moved to Toronto where he played live performances. In 1978, he was signed by CBS Canada with plans to record an album in Los Angeles to be released on the Epic Records label.

Songs 
José Feliciano appears on "Only Your Heart Can Say" on guitar and background vocals.

“Quiet Moment" was included on Shine, Mono Presents 70s Shine American Music Masterpiece Collection, released by Sony Music direct (Japan) in 2003, as track No. 8, alongside tracks by Eric Anderson, Tony Kosinec, Dan Fogelberg, Dave Mason, Ned Doheny, Fools Gold, Cecilio & Kapono, Les Dudek, Simon & Garfunkel, Livingston Taylor, Bob Dylan, Dane Donohue, Willie Nelson, Eric Gale, and James Taylor.

Track listing

Personnel 
Credits are adapted from liner notes of the Dream Master album.

(Note: the numbers below refer to the songs in the order of the tracking listing)

Produced by – Henry Lewy  
Except the song “Only Love”: produced by – Billie Hughes, the song “Catch Me Smilin’”: produced by – Dale Jacobs
Carlton Lee – engineer
Gary Lyons – remixing, engineer
John Weaver – assistant engineer
Joe Gastwirt and Jo Hansch – mastering
Ian Freebairn-Smith – string, woodwind, horn arrangements, conductor
Mike Melvoin (1, 2, 9, 10), piano
Randy Kumano (4), piano
Lincoln Mayorga (5), piano
Doug Louie (8) – piano
Mike Melvoin (3), piano
Dale Jacobs (8) – electric piano
Wilton Felder (1, 2, 3, 6, 7, 10), bass
Allen Soberman (4), bass
Joel Wade (8), 
Michael Porcaro (9) – bass
Russ Kunkel (1), drums
Jeffrey Porcaro (3, 6, 9, 10), drums
John Dell (4), drums
Rick Shlosser (7), drums
Kat Hendrihse (8) – drums
Will McFarland (1, 6), guitar
Tony Peluso (2), guitar
Mitch Holder (2, 3, 9, 10), guitar
Jay Graydon (2, 7), guitar
Terry Frewer (8), 
Brett Wade (8), 
José Feliciano (9) – electric guitar
Billie Hughes (all tracks), 
Oscar Castro-Neves (7) – acoustic guitar
Gary Lyons (1, 6), percussion
Steve Foreman (2, 5, 9, 10), 
Victor Feldman (3, 7) – percussion
Bill Hughes (3, 5, 7, 8, 9), 
Renee Armand (3, 10), background vocals
Laura Creamer (3), background vocals
Clark Burroughs (3, 7), background vocals
Colleen Peterson (5, 10), background vocals
Terry Frewer (8), 
Brett Wade (8), 
Joanie Taylor (8), 
José Feliciano (9), guitar, background vocals
Venetta Fields (9), background vocals
Sherlie Matthews (9), background vocals
Paulette Brown (9), background vocals
Ian Freebairn-Smith (10) – backing vocals

References

1979 debut albums
Billie Hughes albums
Albums produced by Henry Lewy
Albums recorded at A&M Studios
CBS Records albums
Epic Records albums